Muamed Sejdini (born 25 November 1969) is a member of FIFA and UEFA administrators in football who is currently serving as the 5th president of Football Federation of Macedonia.

He previously served as vice president in 2014 to 2018 and was acting president for eight months in 2018 when president Ilcho Gjorgjioski stepped down.

Notes 

1969 births
People from Macedonia (region)
Living people